Solwezi West is a constituency of the National Assembly of Zambia. It covers the towns of Mayana, Mumena and Mutanda in Kalumbila District of North-Western Province.

List of MPs

References

Constituencies of the National Assembly of Zambia
Constituencies established in 1973
1973 establishments in Zambia